Ashanti Obi (born 14 October 1952) is a Nigerian sprinter. She competed in the women's 4 × 100 metres relay at the 1972 Summer Olympics.

References

1952 births
Living people
Athletes (track and field) at the 1972 Summer Olympics
Athletes (track and field) at the 1974 British Commonwealth Games
Commonwealth Games competitors for Nigeria
Nigerian female sprinters
Olympic athletes of Nigeria
Place of birth missing (living people)
Olympic female sprinters
20th-century Nigerian women
21st-century Nigerian women